Platyberyx is a genus of manefishes native to the eastern Atlantic Ocean.

Species
There are currently five recognized species in this genus:
 Platyberyx mauli Kukuev, Parin & Trunov, 2012
 Platyberyx opalescens Zugmayer, 1911
 Platyberyx paucus D. E. Stevenson & Kenaley, 2013
 Platyberyx pietschi D. E. Stevenson & Kenaley, 2013
 Platyberyx rhyton D. E. Stevenson & Kenaley, 2013

References

Caristiidae
Taxa named by Erich Zugmayer